This is a list of NASCAR drivers that have raced in one of its national or touring series who are African Americans. Many of the current drivers and some of the former drivers have previously been or are currently members of NASCAR's Drive for Diversity program.

Wendell Scott (1 win) and Bubba Wallace (2 wins) are the only two drivers to have won NASCAR Cup Series races. Wallace also has 6 wins in the Truck Series and is the only African-American driver to have won in that series. There so far has not been an African-American driver who has won an Xfinity Series race.

Current drivers
These African-American drivers competed in NASCAR in 2022. All statistics in this table are as of the end of the 2022 season.

Inactive and retired drivers
Sources:

References

African American
NASCAR drivers,African American
NASCAR drivers